This article lists the governors of the Danish West Indies or Danish Antilles or Danish Virgin Islands, a Danish colony in the Caribbean encompassing the territory of the present-day United States Virgin Islands.

Governors of St. Thomas 

St. Thomas was claimed by Denmark–Norway in 1665.

Governors of St. Thomas and St. John 

St. John (St. Jan) was claimed by Danish West India Company in 1683, which was disputed by the British until 1718.

Governors of St. Croix 

St. Croix was bought from French West India Company in 1733.

In 1754, the Danish West Indies were sold by Danish West India Company to King Frederick V, becoming royal Danish-Norwegian colonies. Hereafter, St. Croix was governed by the Governors-General of the Danish West Indies.

Governor-generals of the Danish West Indies 

The Danish West Indies were sold by Denmark to the United States on December 12, 1916. The administration was officially turned over on March 31, 1917, and the first US governor was Navy Captain Edwin Taylor Pollock. For governors of the territory after the establishment of the US administration, see List of governors of the United States Virgin Islands.

See also 
History of the United States Virgin Islands
Danish colonization of the Americas
1868 Danish West Indies status referendum
1916 Danish West Indies status referendum
1916 Danish West Indian Islands sale referendum
Treaty of the Danish West Indies
Transfer Day

Notes

References

Bibliography 
 Waldemar Westergaard, The Danish West Indies under Company Rule (1671 – 1754) (MacMillan, New York, 1917)
 World Statesmen. Retrieved April 6, 2006

 
Danish West Indies
Lists of office-holders in Denmark
Danish West Indies